Vitellidelos is a genus of land snails in the family Rhytididae. This genus is found in Australia.

Species include:
Vitellidelos costata – strong-ribbed carnivorous snail
Vitellidelos dorrigoensis – Dorrigo carnivorous snail
Vitellidelos dulcis – Sydney carnivorous snail
Vitellidelos helmsiana – Snowy Mountains carnivorous snail
Vitellidelos kaputarensis – Mount Kaputar carnivorous snail

References

Rhytididae